Ubay, officially the Municipality of Ubay,  is a fast growing 1st class municipality in the province of Bohol, Philippines. According to the 2020 PSA census, it has a population of 81,799 people which is projected to grow to 100,000 in 2030.

Ubay is in the northeast of the province, and has an uncontested area of 258.132847 square kilometers (25,813.2847 hectares) and has a contested area of 5.87 square kilometers (587.8688 hectares) with other Municipality per certification issued by the Land Management Bureau(LMB) of the DENR. It is the largest (estimated eight times (8x) larger than the capital city of Tagbilaran) and most populated municipality in Bohol.I

Etymology

One etymology derivation is that the town's name is a contraction of the term ubay-ubay, meaning "alongside".

According to Kaufmann's Visayan-English dictionary, the Visayan word "ubay"  means:

The flow of seawater between the mainland and the island of Lapinig Grande (now Pres. C.P. Garcia town) could justify the second definition of Ubay. It is a situation that is permanent and the constant reference to the flow of water can make the term ubay be attached as the name of the place.

An alternative derivation is that the term 'ubay-ubay' or 'alongside' became the byword of seafarers who used to travel close to the shorelines of Ubay to avoid the strong current of the Canigao Channel. There was a single path to follow reach the island trading centres. This trail was located alongside (ubay) the sandy beach. Later on the term Ubay became the original name of the community.

History

Historically, Ubay was part of Talibon. On 15 January 1844, it separated from Talibon to become an independent municipality.

The religious aspect of the town was established much later than the civil aspect of the town. The decree of the Spanish Governor General creating Ubay as a town in the religious aspect is dated 22 October 1877. However, Royal Order No. 695 issued by the Kingdom of Spain has the date 5 October 1877.

The town celebrates its fiesta every last Friday of January in commemoration and honor of their patron saint, Holy Child. Ubayanons often come home during fiesta to share the joy of reviving the beautiful old story on the origin of the place.

Science Cityhood

House Bill No. 5203 was filed by the 2nd district representative Congresswoman Maria Vanessa C. Aumentado last September 27, 2021 for the conversion of the municipality of Ubay into a component city to be known as the Science City of Ubay in the province of Bohol. The bill was referred to the Committee on Local Government in the House of representatives. If enacted, it will be the second Science CIty in the country next to the Science City of Muñoz.

Geography
The town is situated east of Trinidad, north of Alicia and Mabini, and northeast of San Miguel.

Climate

The climate is typically equatorial – temperature range over the year is less than three degrees Celsius ( deg F), and annual rainfall exceeds .  The dry season starts in February and lasts through April sometimes extending to midMay.  The climate in Ubay falls within Coronas climate type IV, characterized by not very pronounced maximum rainfall with a short dry season from one to three months and a wet season of nine to ten months.

Ubay has a tropical climate. Most months of the year are marked by significant precipitation, making agriculture favorable – it supports at least two rice crops per year.  The short dry season has little impact. Ubay is classified as Am (Tropical monsoon climate) by  climate classification system.

Barangays

Ubay comprises 44 barangays organized into eight urban districts (UD):
{{PH brgy table lite|top|2=heavy
|3= 
|4= Date of Fiesta 
}}
|

| style="text-align:center;" data-sort-value=401 | IV|| style="text-align:center;" data-sort-value="" | 15 January

| style="text-align:center;" data-sort-value=302 | III || style="text-align:center;" data-sort-value="" | 21 May

| style="text-align:center;" data-sort-value=703 | VII || style="text-align:center;" data-sort-value="" | 13 May

| style="text-align:center;" data-sort-value=804 | VIII || style="text-align:center;" data-sort-value="" | 17 May

| style="text-align:center;" data-sort-value=205 | II || style="text-align:center;" data-sort-value="" | 8 December

| style="text-align:center;" data-sort-value=506 | V || style="text-align:center;" data-sort-value="" | 15 January

| style="text-align:center;" data-sort-value=107 | I || style="text-align:center;" data-sort-value="" | Last Saturday of April  

| style="text-align:center;" data-sort-value=208 | II || style="text-align:center;" data-sort-value="" | 8 December

| style="text-align:center;" data-sort-value=709 | VII || style="text-align:center;" data-sort-value="" | 24 January

| style="text-align:center;" data-sort-value=310 | III || style="text-align:center;" data-sort-value="" | 8 December

| style="text-align:center;" data-sort-value=211 | II || style="text-align:center;" data-sort-value="" | 13 May

| style="text-align:center;" data-sort-value=312 | III || style="text-align:center;" data-sort-value="" | 26 November

| style="text-align:center;" data-sort-value=413 | IV || style="text-align:center;" data-sort-value="" | 15 May

| style="text-align:center;" data-sort-value=414 | IV || style="text-align:center;" data-sort-value="" | 5 April

| style="text-align:center;" data-sort-value=815 | VIII || style="text-align:center;" data-sort-value="" | 6 February

| style="text-align:center;" data-sort-value=516 | V || style="text-align:center;" data-sort-value="" | 13 May

| style="text-align:center;" data-sort-value=217 | II || style="text-align:center;" data-sort-value="" | 9 December

| style="text-align:center;" data-sort-value=118 | I || style="text-align:center;" data-sort-value="" | 15 May

| style="text-align:center;" data-sort-value=819 | VIII || style="text-align:center;" data-sort-value="" | 15 January

| style="text-align:center;" data-sort-value=320 | III || style="text-align:center;" data-sort-value="" | 15 January

| style="text-align:center;" data-sort-value=421 | IV || style="text-align:center;" data-sort-value="" | 14 February

| style="text-align:center;" data-sort-value=122 | I || style="text-align:center;" data-sort-value="" | 15 May

| style="text-align:center;" data-sort-value=723 | VII || style="text-align:center;" data-sort-value="" | 8 May &27 November

| style="text-align:center;" data-sort-value=724 | VII || style="text-align:center;" data-sort-value="" | 23 May

| style="text-align:center;" data-sort-value=525 | V || style="text-align:center;" data-sort-value="" | 30 May

| style="text-align:center;" data-sort-value=226 | II || style="text-align:center;" data-sort-value="" | 15 January

| style="text-align:center;" data-sort-value=227 | II || style="text-align:center;" data-sort-value="" | 27 April

| style="text-align:center;" data-sort-value=328 | III || style="text-align:center;" data-sort-value="" | 8 December

| style="text-align:center;" data-sort-value=429 | IV || style="text-align:center;" data-sort-value="" | 15 December

| style="text-align:center;" data-sort-value=530 | V || style="text-align:center;" data-sort-value="" | Last Friday of January  

| style="text-align:center;" data-sort-value=131 | I || style="text-align:center;" data-sort-value="" | 26 June

| style="text-align:center;" data-sort-value=632 | VI || style="text-align:center;" data-sort-value="" | 21 May

| style="text-align:center;" data-sort-value=133 | I || style="text-align:center;" data-sort-value="" | Last Saturday of April  

| style="text-align:center;" data-sort-value=834 | VIII || style="text-align:center;" data-sort-value="" | 5 April

| style="text-align:center;" data-sort-value=635 | VI || style="text-align:center;" data-sort-value="" | 29 May

| style="text-align:center;" data-sort-value=737 | VII || style="text-align:center;" data-sort-value="" | 8 December

| style="text-align:center;" data-sort-value=638 | VI || style="text-align:center;" data-sort-value="" | 3 May

| style="text-align:center;" data-sort-value=539 | V || style="text-align:center;" data-sort-value="" | 29 June

| style="text-align:center;" data-sort-value=840 | VIII || style="text-align:center;" data-sort-value="" | 29 September

| style="text-align:center;" data-sort-value=641 | VI || style="text-align:center;" data-sort-value="" | 5 April

| style="text-align:center;" data-sort-value=342 | III || style="text-align:center;" data-sort-value="" | 16 May

| style="text-align:center;" data-sort-value=443 | IV || style="text-align:center;" data-sort-value="" | 15 January

| style="text-align:center;" data-sort-value=644 | VI || style="text-align:center;" data-sort-value="" | 15 January

| style="text-align:center;" data-sort-value=145 | I || style="text-align:center;" data-sort-value="" | 28 November

Demographics

When the first national census was held in 1903, the municipality had a population 7,355. The population markedly decreased in 1970 with the creation of the municipality of President Carlos P. Garcia, formerly a constituent barangay.

The primary language is Cebuano: Filipino and English are understood to a limited degree.

Economy 

Ubay has a number of business establishments commercial trading firms engaged in retail and wholesale. The new public market building was completed in 2000. The regular market day is Monday and local traders from neighboring towns come to sell their merchandise consisting mostly of agricultural products and small consumer items like used clothes, household utensils, and other products. Ubay also provides a market for the neighboring island municipality of Pres. Carlos P. Garcia, Municipality of Bien Unido , Alica and Mabini. Another well-known public market is located in barangay San Pascual, south of the municipality.

Ubay is one of the growth centers in and considered the dairy capital of the province where the Philippine Carabao Center (PCC), National Dairy Authority (NDA) and the Ubay Stock Farm the largest and oldest livestock in the country with more than 3,000 hectares is located in the Municipality. The Municipality is also center for agri-industrial production and the biggest producers of poultry products in central visayas produced by the Marcela Farms Inc. (Alturas group of companies) located in Barangay Lomangog produce tons of poultry products like dress chicken. Ubay is also one of the top producers of fish products as it has more than 1,000 hectares of fishpond. The Municipality is a center for agriculture with government establishments like the Philippine Coconut Authority (PCA), the Bureau of Fisheries and Aquatic Resources (BFAR), Bohol Experiential Station (BES), Bureau of Soil and Water Management (BSWM) and the Central Visayas Integrated Agricultural Research Center (CENVIARC) are located. The Municipality is also considered the rice granary of the province with 51% of its total land area is intended for agriculture in which majority of its rice fields are irrigated.

Tourism and culture

Ubay is the center of Eco-Agri Tourism considering its grass land area of the Ubay Stock Farm with carabaos and cows that similar to the scenery of New Zealand plus the learning experience you will gain when you visit their Department of Agriculture Facilities.

Delicacies
 Ube Calamay: It is a purple rice cake, (Calamay) with Ube or purple yam. This sweet and delightful delicacy is said to be originated from this town because of its large plantations of Ube (purple yam).
 Fried Ube bread: Another mouthwatering delicacy made of ube.  It is bread deepfried then filled with purple yam.
 Chocobao: a chocolate flavored pasteurized carabao milk that has a nutritional value that is a product of the Philippine Carabao Center in Barangay Lomangog. 
 Puto cheese: a special puto made from the milk of carabao.  
 Other dairy Products

Ubay-ubay Festival
Like the Sinulog of Cebu, the Ubay-ubay Festival is the town's own version in celebration and honor of the patron saint, Sr. Santo Niño. This colorful and fascinating festivity is a well-attended event where people flock the town's major roads and venues to view the grand street parade and the festival dance-competition. This celebration is held every last Friday of January.

Government

Ubay is governed by the municipal mayor as head of the municipality. The vice mayor is the next highest position and acts as the presiding officer of the municipal council.

Infrastructure

Transport

The most common form of local transportation is the tricycle for nearer barangays. For far barangays, the motorcycle is the most common. All barangays are connected by roads and the only places without roads are the steep slopes of the central mountains.

The improvement of the Bohol circumferential road and the port facilities helped Ubay to become the trading and transportation hub of northeastern Bohol, connecting it to the neighboring island of Leyte and the rest of Bohol province. Passenger and cargo traffic to these destinations has noticeably increased over the years indicating an increasing volume of trade between these points.

Land transportation is provided by various short and long-distance buses, jeeps and vans, connecting Ubay to the rest of the towns in the province. Tagbilaran can be reached from Ubay in two to three hours by bus or van. There are also daily combined road/ferry services to Metro Manila (Pasay / Cubao, Quezon City).

Ubay seaport is considered the province's principal gateway to Leyte, and Samar. Its improved port area is linked to the major port destinations of neighboring provinces such as Bato and Hilongos in Leyte, Maasin City in Southern Leyte, and Cebu City, the regional capital. Four vessels travels to and from Cebu City daily, and routes to and from Bato, Hilongos and Maasin City are also served daily. The journey time for each destination is 4–5 hours.

Tapal Wharf is another port terminal located in northeastern barangay of Tapal that serves the President Carlos P. Garcia-Ubay and vice-versa route.

Camambugan Airport 

Ubay is home to one of only three airports in Bohol (the other  Bohol–Panglao International Airport and Tagbilaran Old Airport), but Ubay Airport is currently ongoing expansion and development which is delayed by the recent pandemic. It is proposed to be a service airport for airlines and budget airport that will connect to other provinces and tourists from other tourism destinations.

Health

For health services, the town has three public Rural Health Units (RHU) staffed by doctors, nurses, midwives, dentists, medical technologists and sanitary inspectors. A small government hospital was established to provide outpatient services to local residents. A private 15-bed hospital in Fatima also provides services for emergencies. A pediatrics and OB-gyne clinic complements the health services available in town. A Public Rural Health Unit (RHU) 4 and RHU 5 is being eyed to be constructed within three years period in 2023-2025. 

Don Emilio Del Valle Memorial Hospital in barangay Bood is a National Government Hospital  was established in 2003 from a donated lot with a current bed capacity of 300 as of 2019. It became the first agency in the province to be granted with ISO 9001:2008 QMS Certification by TUV SUD. In July 2015, it was granted a certificate of full ISO compliance by TUV SUD. In 2017, it acquired its ISO 9001:2015 Certification by TÜV Rheinland.

Barangay Health Workers (BHW) from each barangay provide direct health care assistance to barangay residents.

Public order and safety
The local police force is 37 police officers. Police–population ratio is 1:, {{#ifexpr:>1000|less|more}} favourable than the standard ratio of 1:1,000. The police are augmented by 492 Barangay Tanod volunteers. It is reported that crime rate in Ubay is relatively low. The local Fire Department is staffed by eight fire fighters with two fire trucks. Incidence of fires is reportedly low in the municipality.

Utilities

Bohol was linked to the major source of geothermal power in Leyte through the underwater connection between Maasin City, Southern Leyte and Ubay. Presently, only three of the 44 barangays have no electricity, yet only 34.97 percent of the total households in the municipality have electricity compared to the province, which was 58.3 percent energized in 2000.

The town proper and seven other barangays were served by the Ubay Water Service Cooperative. The cooperative planned to expand their service to eight other barangays in the near future. Due to consumer demand and the limited size of the supply, water service became difficult during dry months. Bohol province reported that 23.71 percent of its households had their own faucets from a community system while Ubay reported only 8.97 percent.

For the province, 21.68 percent of households had access to shared faucets while Ubay only had 8.86 percent. In Ubay, slightly more than half (51.83%) of the households had access to dug wells.

Education

Elementary Education

There are 45 public elementary schools in the municipality located in each barangay and one on Tres Reyes island.

There are 7 private pre-school and elementary schools.

Secondary Education
There are 19 public and private high schools in the municipality which offer junior and senior high school curriculum.

 Accountancy, Business, and Management (ABM)
 General Academic Strand (GAS)
 Humanities and Social Sciences (HUMSS)
 Science, Technology, Engineering, and Mathematics (STEM)
 Technical, Vocational, and Livelihood (TVL)

Tertiary Education
 Bohol Northern Star Colleges - To meet the increasing demands for college education,  Bohol Northeastern College was founded in 1996 by Bohol political leaders, former governors Erico B. Aumentado and David B. Tirol. The name was later changed to its present name in January 2007.
 Ubay Community College

Notable personalities

 Erico B. Aumentado – Bohol governor who served three consecutive terms (2001–2010), former deputy speaker of the Philippine House of Representatives, former congressman of Bohol's 2nd District, former provincial vice-governor and board member.
 Karen Gallman - beauty queen, Miss Intercontinental 2018, the first ever Filipina to win the title. Also won Binibining Pilipinas Intercontinental 2018.

References

Sources

External links

 [ Philippine Standard Geographic Code]
 Municipality of Ubay, Bohol

 
Municipalities of Bohol